The Abington Township High School was a complex of educational buildings at 1801 Susquehanna Road in Abington Township, Pennsylvania.  The  property included a number of buildings, including the township's first purpose-built school building.  Buildings in the complex served as a high school, junior high school, and school administration facility.  All but the oldest building were demolished in 1996, replaced by a senior living facility.  The complex was listed on the National Register of Historic Places in 1985.

References

See also
National Register of Historic Places listings in Montgomery County, Pennsylvania

		
National Register of Historic Places in Montgomery County, Pennsylvania
Queen Anne architecture in Pennsylvania
Romanesque Revival architecture in Pennsylvania
Art Deco architecture in Pennsylvania